is a railway station in  Hamakita-ku, Hamamatsu,  Shizuoka Prefecture, Japan, operated by the private railway company, Enshū Railway.

Lines
Hamakita Station is a station on the  Enshū Railway Line and is 15.0 kilometers from the starting point of the line at Shin-Hamamatsu Station.

Station layout
The station has a single island platform, with the station building built onto one end of the platform. The station building has automated ticket machines, and automated turnstiles which accept the NicePass smart card, as well as ET Card, a magnetic card ticketing system. The station is unattended.

Platforms

Adjacent stations

|-
!colspan=5|Enshū Railway

Station History
It was given its present name in April 1923. The station was rebuilt in 1990 approximately 110 meters south of its former location.

Passenger statistics
In fiscal 2017, the station was used by an average of 658 passengers daily (boarding passengers only).

Surrounding area
Hamakita Special Education School

See also
 List of railway stations in Japan

References

External links

 Enshū Railway official website

Railway stations in Japan opened in 1909
Railway stations in Shizuoka Prefecture
Railway stations in Hamamatsu
Stations of Enshū Railway